Sorouri (Persian: سروری) is an Iranian surname. Notable people with the surname include:

Jamileh Sorouri (born 1950), Iranian gymnast
Nabi Sorouri (1933–2002), Iranian wrestler
Paradise Sorouri, Afghan rapper
Parviz Sorouri (born 1960), Iranian politician 

Persian-language surnames